The 34th Chicago Film Critics Association Awards were announced on December 15, 2021. The awards honor the best in film for 2021. The nominations were announced on December 13, 2021. West Side Story received the most nominations (11), followed by The Power of the Dog (8) and The Green Knight (7).

Winners and nominees
The winners and nominees for the 34th Chicago Film Critics Association Awards are as follows:

Awards

Awards breakdown

The following films received multiple nominations:

The following films received multiple wins:

References

External links
 

2021 film awards
 2021